9,12-octadecadienoate 8-hydroperoxide 8R-isomerase (5,8-LDS (bifunctional enzyme), 5,8-linoleate diol synthase (bifunctional enzyme), 8-hydroperoxide isomerase, (8R,9Z,12Z)-8-hydroperoxy-9,12-octadecadienoate mutase ((5S,8R,9Z,12Z)-5,8-dihydroxy-9,12-octadecadienoate-forming), PpoA) is an enzyme with systematic name (8R,9Z,12Z)-8-hydroperoxyoctadeca-9,12-dienoate hydroxymutase ((5S,8R,9Z,12Z)-5,8-dihydroxyoctadeca-9,12-dienoate-forming). This enzyme catalyses the following chemical reaction

 (8R,9Z,12Z)-8-hydroperoxyoctadeca-9,12-dienoate  (5S,8R,9Z,12Z)-5,8-dihydroxyoctadeca-9,12-dienoate

This enzyme contains heme.

References

External links 
 

EC 5.4.4